Judith Pinedo Flórez, also known as "Mariamulata", is a Colombian lawyer and politician born in the city of Cartagena de Indias; she was elected mayor of that city for the period 2008 - 2011. Her rival was Juan Carlos Gossain who was considered as a continuator of the policies of Mayor Nicolás Curi, who had been involved in several corruption scandals, thus  she became the first woman to be popularly elected in her city as mayor, where, in addition, never before had an independent politician been able to win the first position.

References

Colombian women lawyers
Living people
Mayors of places in Colombia
Women mayors of places in Colombia
Year of birth missing (living people)
People from Cartagena, Colombia